A fish bowl is a container for fish.

Fishbowl may also refer to:

Terminology 
 A car with no window tints as to show its interior
 Fishbowl (conversation), a debate format

Television 
 "My Fishbowl", an episode of the television show Scrubs
 Amazon Fishbowl, a talk show on Amazon.com hosted by comedian Bill Maher

Music 
 "Fishbowl", a song on the album Mythologies, by artist Rhett Miller
 "Fishbowl", a song on the album Very Proud of Ya, by the band AFI
 "Fishbowl", a song on the album In the Meantime, by the singer Alessia Cara

Technology 
 Operation Fishbowl, a series of high altitude nuclear explosion tests conducted by the United States as part of Operation Dominic I and II
 Fishbowl (software), a Facebook application developed by Microsoft
 Fishbowl (secure phone) a secure Android phone developed by the U.S. National Security Agency

Nickname 
 The GM New Look bus, a common model of transit bus
 Shaw Park in Winnipeg, Manitoba
 Del Rio, Florida, a community in the United States
 The "Pesciara" of Monte Bolca, a site famous for fish fossils near Verona, Italy
 Apollo/Skylab A7L space suit's "fishbowl helmet"
 The Class 332 and Class 333 trains in Great Britain have been given the nickname "The fishbowls" by many British railway enthusiasts. This is primarily because of their round fronts, which show a small bit of resemblance to fishbowls.